Zaduqabad (also Romanized as Z̄ādūqābād; also known as Jāwa, Zadagh Abad, and Z̄ādeqābād) is a village in Esfandan Rural District, in the Central District of Komijan County, Markazi Province, Iran. At the 2006 census, its population was 72, in 21 families.

References 

Populated places in Komijan County